Jerome Jones (born October 25, 1981), also known by his stage names Romeo and Young Rome, is an American rapper and singer. He is a member of R&B group Immature/IMx. Jones released his solo debut album Food for Thought in 2004.

Music career

Jones is a founding member of R&B group Immature/IMx, which included Marques "Batman" Houston and Kelton "LDB" Kessee and was managed by Chris Stokes. Jones' nickname at this time was "Romeo". The group released four albums under the name Immature: On Our Worst Behavior (1992), Playtyme Is Over (1994), We Got It (1995) and The Journey (1997). In 1999, the group underwent a name change and continued on to release two albums under the name IMx: Introducing IMx (1999) and IMx (2001). The group also branched out into film (House Party 4: Down to the Last Minute) and television (A Different World) before disbanding in 2002.

In 2004, Jones began pursuing a solo career. Under the name Young Rome, he released his debut album titled Food for Thought on June 22. The album featured the singles "After Party" (featuring former B2K member Omarion) and "Freaky" (featuring rapper Guerilla Black).

Discography

Albums

Singles

Acting career

Filmography

Television

Film

Eye condition
Throughout most of his career with Immature/IMX, Jones wore an eye patch over his right eye, leading to speculation that Jones had an eye condition. However, Jones later clarified the situation in a verse from his song "Look Down On Me", featured on his debut album Food For Thought:

Jones has stated that he was hit in the eye with a book.

References

External links

Official Myspace

American contemporary R&B singers
IMx members
Pop rappers
Living people
1981 births
21st-century American singers
21st-century American rappers
African-American male singers